Djoko Tjahjono Iskandar (born 1950) is an Indonesian herpetologist who studies the amphibians of Southeast Asia and Australasia. He is a professor of biosystematics and ecology at Bandung Institute of Technology in West Java, Indonesia.

Iskandar has been the first to describe many species of amphibian, including the Bornean flat-headed frog (Barbourula kalimantanensis) in 1978, and, in 2014, Limnonectes larvaepartus, the only known frog that directly births tadpoles. He is the author of The Amphibians of Java and Bali. The monotypic banded watersnake genus Djokoiskandarus is named in his honour, as are several species of lizard and frog.

Taxa named in his honour
Djokoiskandarus annulatus (2011)
Polypedates iskandari (2011)
Draco iskandari (2007)
Gekko iskandari (2000)
Fejervarya iskandari (2001)

Species described 
Ansonia glandulosa Iskandar & Mumpuni, 2004
Barbourula kalimantanensis Iskandar, 1978
Boiga hoeseli Ramadhan, Iskandar & Subasri, 2010
Calamaria banggaiensis Koch, Arida, Mcguire, Iskandar & Böhme, 2009
Cyrtodactylus batik Iskandar, Rachmansah & Umilaela, 2011
Cyrtodactylus nuaulu Oliver, Edgar, Mumpuni, Iskandar & Lilley, 2009 
Cyrtodactylus wallacei Hayden, et al., 2008 
Eutropis grandis Howard, Gillespie, Riyanto, Iskandar, 2007
Hemiphyllodactylus engganoensis Grismer, Riyanto, Iskandar & McGuire, 2014
Hylarana eschatia (Inger, Stuart, & Iskandar, 2009)
Hylarana megalonesa (Inger, Stuart & Iskandar, 2009)
Hylarana parvacola (Inger, Stuart & Iskandar, 2009)
Hylarana rufipes (Inger, Stuart & Iskandar, 2009)
Ingerana rajae Iskandar, Bickford, Arifin, 2011
Kalophrynus minusculus Iskandar, 1998
Limnonectes kadarsani Iskandar, Boeadi & Sancoyo, 1996
Limnonectes larvaepartus Iskandar, Evans & McGuire, 2014
Limnonectes sisikdagu McLeod, Horner, Husted, Barley & Iskandar, 2011
Litoria megalops (Richards & Iskandar, 2006)
Litoria purpureolata Oliver, Richards, Tjaturadi & Iskandar, 2007
Litoria wapogaensis Richards & Iskandar, 2001
Occidozyga tompotika Iskandar, Arifin & Rachmansah, 2011
Oreophryne atrigularis Günther, Richards & Iskandar, 2001
Oreophryne furu Günther, Richards, Tjaturadi, and Iskandar, 2009
Oreophryne minuta Richards & Iskandar, 2000
Oreophryne wapoga Günther, Richards & Iskandar, 2001
Xenophrys parallela (Inger & Iskandar, 2005)

References

External links
Frogweb.org – Frogs of the Malay Peninsula – Djoko Iskandar
Djoko Iskandar - Curriculum Vitae
ITIS Advanced Search for taxon author "Iskandar"

1950 births
Living people
Indonesian Muslims
Bandung Institute of Technology
Indonesian herpetologists